Rachakonda Viswanatha Sastri (Ravi Sastri) (1922–1993) was a Telugu writer who published several novels and more than 60 short stories in six volumes. Often praised for his unique style, Ravi Sastry supported marginalized communities. Professionally, he was a lawyer.

Education
Rachakonda Viswanatha Sastry graduated with honours to obtain his B.A. from Andhra University, Visakhapatnam. In 1946, he completed his B.L. degree at Madras University. Having gained professional expertise in law by working with Taatha Sriramamurthy, an established senior lawyer, he started his own law practice in 1950. He began his career as a dedicated congressional leader. In his later years (1960) he was influenced by Marxist theory.

As a writer
In 1947, he observed the lifestyle of the inhabitants of Srikakulam and Vizianagaram, as well as major changes in urban lifestyles at Visakhapatnam. The perceived inhumanity in these new ways of life caused much distress, and Sastry was the first, after Gurajada Apparao and Sripadala, to employ dialects in writing about the effect of these changes.

First novel
Written in 1952, the novel  was an experimental foray into the world of Telugu literature. It was very well received and went on to become one of the most successful Telugu novels.

Career

Near the end of his career, he wrote the novel .  is considered his best work among the several novels that he wrote during his career. But "Raju Mahishi Prema Manishi" delved deep into the social fabric of the then-middle class, lower class and upper class society and brought out the structural weaknesses plaguing those classes very articulately. In fact, it was compared to the beauty of the unfinished statue of Lord Visweswara at Varanasi.

Stories
He wrote six stories which analyze the effects of the Liquor Act in Andhra Pradesh and also about the misuse of this act. These stories are now famous in Telugu literature.

Novels
  (1955)
  (1961)
  (1966)
  (1967)
  (1968)
  (1969)
  (1972)
  (1973)
  (1975)
 
 
 
 
 

Dramas, playlets
 
 
 

Honors
In 1983, he was honored with the Kalaprapoorna Award by Andhra University. He refused this award. He received a Sahitya Akademi Award in the 1960s. Sastry returned in 1975 as a mark of protest against emergency and his incarceration during that period, though he came out on parole.

Acting
He was not only a writer, but an actor. Ravi Sastry said, "Every writer should think that my writings are neither harmful to the good nor helpful to the bad."

Death
Ravi Sastri died on 10 November 1993.

References

Telugu writers
Indian male novelists
1922 births
1993 deaths
20th-century Indian novelists
Andhra University alumni
People from Srikakulam
Novelists from Andhra Pradesh
Indian male dramatists and playwrights
20th-century Indian dramatists and playwrights
Dramatists and playwrights from Andhra Pradesh
20th-century Indian male writers
People from Visakhapatnam
People from Uttarandhra